Indera Mills, also known as Maline Mills, is a historic textile mill complex located at Winston-Salem, Forsyth County, North Carolina.  The complex includes a two-story, gable roof brick building with a brick addition (c. 1904, 1916); a small, one-story brick boiler room building (c. 1904); and two flat-roof brick buildings built between 1907 and 1912 with their long sides contiguous. Indera Mills occupied the complex until 1998.  The complex has been converted to commercial and residential use.

It was listed on the National Register of Historic Places in 1999.

References

Textile mills in North Carolina
Industrial buildings and structures on the National Register of Historic Places in North Carolina
Industrial buildings completed in 1904
Buildings and structures in Winston-Salem, North Carolina
National Register of Historic Places in Winston-Salem, North Carolina